Slavery in the colonial history of the United States, from 1526 to 1776, developed from complex factors, and researchers have proposed several theories to explain the development of the institution of slavery and of the slave trade. Slavery strongly correlated with the European colonies' demand for labor, especially for the labor-intensive plantation economies of the sugar colonies in the Caribbean and South America, operated by Great Britain, France, Spain, Portugal, and the Dutch Republic.

Slave-ships of the Atlantic slave trade transported captives for slavery from Africa to the Americas. Indigenous people were also enslaved in the North American colonies, but on a smaller scale, and Indian slavery largely ended in the late eighteenth century. Enslavement of Indigenous people did continue to occur in the Southern states until the Emancipation Proclamation issued by President Abraham Lincoln in 1863. Slavery was also used as a punishment for crimes committed by free people. In the colonies, slave status for Africans became hereditary with the adoption and application of civil law into colonial law, which defined the status of children born in the colonies as determined by the mother - known as partus sequitur ventrem. Children born to enslaved women were born enslaved, regardless of paternity. Children born to free women were free, regardless of ethnicity. By the time of the American Revolution, the European colonial powers had embedded chattel slavery for Africans and their descendants throughout the Americas, including the future United States.

Native Americans

Native Americans enslaved members of their own and other tribes, usually as a result of taking captives in raids and warfare, both before and after Europeans arrived. This practice continued into the 1800s. In some cases, especially for young women or children, Native American families adopted captives to replace members they had lost. Enslavement was not necessarily hereditary. Slaves included captives from wars and slave raids; captives bartered from other tribes, sometimes at great distances; children sold by their parents during famines; and men and women who staked themselves in gambling when they had nothing else, which put them into servitude in some cases for life.

In three expeditions between 1514 and 1525, Spanish explorers visited the Carolinas and enslaved Native Americans, who they took to their base on Santo Domingo. The Spanish crown's charter for its 1526 colony in the Carolinas and Georgia was more restrictive. It required that Native Americans be treated well, paid, and converted to Christianity, but it also allowed already enslaved Native Americans to be bought and exported to the Caribbean if they had been enslaved by other Native Americans. This colony did not survive, so it is not clear if it exported any slaves.
Native Americans were enslaved by the Spanish in Florida under the encomienda system. New England and the Carolinas captured Native Americans in wars and distributed them as slaves.

Native Americans captured and enslaved some early European explorers and colonists.

Larger societies structured as chiefdoms kept slaves as unpaid field laborers. In band societies, owning enslaved captives attested to the captor's military prowess. Some war captives were subjected to ritualized torture and execution. Alan Gallay and other historians emphasize differences between Native American enslavement of war captives and the European slave trading system, into which numerous native peoples were integrated. Richard White, in The Middle Ground, elucidates the complex social relationships between Native American groups and the early empires, including 'slave' culture and scalping. Robbie Ethridge states, "Let there be no doubt…that the commercial trade in Indian slaves was not a continuation and adaptation of pre-existing captivity patterns. It was a new kind of slave, requiring a new kind of occupational specialty … organized militaristic slavers."

One example of militaristic slaving can be seen in Nathaniel Bacon's actions in Virginia during the late 1670s. In June 1676, the Virginia assembly granted Bacon and his men what equated to a slave-hunting license by providing that any enemy Native Americans caught were to be slaves for life. They also provided soldiers who had captured Native Americans with the right to "retain and keep all such Native American slaves or other Native American goods as they either have taken or hereafter shall take."  By this order, the assembly had made a public decision to enslave Native Americans.  In the years to follow, other laws resulted in Native Americans being grouped with other non-Christian servants who had imported to the colonies (Negro slaves) as slaves for life.

Puritan New England, Virginia, Spanish Florida, and the Carolina colonies engaged in large-scale enslavement of Native Americans, often through the use of Indian proxies to wage war and acquire the slaves. In New England, slave raiding accompanied the Pequot War and King Philip's War but declined after the latter war ended in 1676. Enslaved Native Americans were in Jamestown from the early years of the settlement, but large-scale cooperation between English slavers and the West and Occaneechi peoples, whom they armed with guns, did not begin until the 1640s. These groups conducted enslaving raids in what is now Georgia, Tennessee, North Carolina, South Carolina, Florida, and possibly Alabama. The Carolina slave trade, which included both trading and direct raids by colonists, was the largest among the British colonies in North America, estimated at 24,000 to 51,000 Native Americans by Gallay.

Historian Ulrich Phillips argues that Africans were inculcated as slaves and the best answer to the labor shortage in the New World because Native American slaves were more familiar with the environment, and would often successfully escape into the frontier territory they knew. Africans had more difficulty surviving in unknown territory. Africans were also more familiar with large scale indigo and rice cultivation, of which Native Americans were unfamiliar.  The early colonial America depended heavily on rice and indigo cultivation producing disease-carrying mosquitoes caused malaria, a disease the Africans were far less susceptible to than Native American slaves.

The first enslaved Africans

Carolinas

The first African slaves in what would become the present-day United States of America arrived August 9, 1526 in Winyah Bay with a Spanish expedition. Lucas Vázquez de Ayllón brought 600 colonists to start a colony. Records say the colonists included enslaved Africans, without saying how many. After a month Ayllón moved the colony to what is now Georgia.

Until the early 18th century, enslaved Africans were difficult to acquire in the British mainland colonies. Most were sold from Africa to the West Indies for the labor-intensive sugar trade. The large plantations and high mortality rates required continued importation of slaves. One of the first major centers of African slavery in the English North American colonies occurred with the founding of Charles Town and the Province of Carolina in 1670. The colony was founded mainly by sugar planters from Barbados, who brought relatively large numbers of African slaves from that island to develop  new plantations in the Carolinas.

To meet agricultural labor needs, colonists also practiced Indian slavery for some time. The Carolinians transformed the Indian slave trade during the late 17th and early 18th centuries by treating such slaves as a trade commodity to be exported, mainly to the West Indies. Historian Alan Gallay estimates that between 1670 and 1715, an estimated 24,000 to 51,000 captive Native Americans were exported from South Carolina to the Caribbean. This was a much higher number than the number of Africans imported to the English mainland colonies during the same period.

Georgia

The first African slaves in what is now Georgia arrived in mid-September 1526 with Lucas Vázquez de Ayllón's establishment of San Miguel de Gualdape on the current Georgia coast. They rebelled and lived with indigenous people, destroying the colony in less than 2 months.

Two centuries later, Georgia was the last of the Thirteen Colonies to be established and the furthest south (Florida was not one of the Thirteen Colonies). Founded in the 1730s, Georgia's powerful backers did not object to slavery as an institution, but their business model was to rely on labor from Britain (primarily England's poor) and they were also concerned with security, given the closeness of then Spanish Florida, and Spain's regular offers to enemy-slaves to revolt or escape. Despite agitation for slavery, it was not until a defeat of the Spanish by Georgia colonials in the 1740s that arguments for opening the colony to slavery intensified. To staff the rice plantations and settlements, Georgia's proprietors relented in 1751, and African slavery grew quickly. After becoming a royal colony, in the 1760s Georgia began importing slaves directly from Africa.

Florida

One African slave, Estevanico arrived with the Narváez expedition in Tampa Bay in April 1528 and marched north with the expedition until September, when they embarked on rafts from the Wakulla River, heading for Mexico.
African slaves arrived again in Florida in 1539 with Hernando de Soto, and in the 1565 founding of St. Augustine, Florida.
When St. Augustine, FL, was founded in 1565, the site already had enslaved Native Americans, whose ancestors had migrated from Cuba.
The Spanish settlement was sparse and they held comparatively few slaves.

The Spanish promised freedom to refugee slaves from the English colonies of South Carolina and Georgia in order to destabilize English settlement. If the slaves converted to Catholicism and agreed to serve in a militia for Spain, they could become Spanish citizens. By 1730 the black settlement known as Fort Mose developed near St. Augustine and was later fortified. There were two known Fort Mose sites in the eighteenth century, and the men helped defend St. Augustine against the British. It is "the only known free black town in the present-day southern United States that a European colonial government-sponsored. The Fort Mose Site, today a National Historic Landmark, is the location of the second Fort Mose." During the nineteenth century, this site became marsh and wetlands.

In 1763, Great Britain took over Florida in an exchange with Spain after defeating France in the Seven Years' War. Spain evacuated its citizens from St. Augustine, including the residents of Fort Mose, transporting them to Cuba. As Britain developed the colony for plantation agriculture, the percentage of slaves in the population in twenty years rose from 18% to almost 65% by 1783.

Texas and the southwest

An African slave, Estevanico, reached Galveston island in November 1528, with the remnants of the Narváez expedition in Florida. The group headed south on the mainland in 1529, trying to reach Spanish settlements. They were captured and held by Native Americans until 1535.
They traveled northwest to the Pacific Coast, then south along the coast to San Miguel de Culiacán, which had been founded in 1531, and then to Mexico City.

Spanish Texas had few African slaves, but the colonists enslaved many Native Americans.
Beginning in 1803, Spain freed slaves who escaped from the Louisiana territory, recently acquired by the United States. More African-descended slaves were brought to Texas by American settlers.

Virginia and Chesapeake Bay

The first recorded Africans in Virginia arrived in late August 1619. The White Lion, a privateer ship owned by Robert Rich, 2nd Earl of Warwick but flying a Dutch flag, docked at what is now Old Point Comfort (located in modern-day Hampton) with approximately 20 Africans. They were captives from the area of present-day Angola and had been seized by the British crew from a Portuguese slave ship, the "São João Bautista". To obtain the Africans, the Jamestown colony traded provisions with the ship.  Some number of these individuals appear to have been treated like indentured servants, since slave laws were not passed until later, in 1641 in Massachusetts and in 1661 in Virginia. But from the beginning, in accordance with the custom of the Atlantic slave trade, most of this relatively small group, appear to have been treated as slaves, with "African" or "negro"  becoming synonymous with "slave".  Virginia enacted laws concerning runaway slaves and 'negroes' in 1672.

Some number of the colony's early Africans earned freedom by fulfilling a work contract or for converting to Christianity. At least one of these, Anthony Johnson, in turn, acquired slaves or indentured servants for workers himself. Historians such as Edmund Morgan say this evidence suggests that racial attitudes were much more flexible in early 17th-century Virginia than they would later become. A 1625 census recorded 23 Africans in Virginia. In 1649 there were 300, and in 1690 there were 950. Over this period, legal distinctions between white indentured servants and "Negros" widened into lifelong and inheritable chattel-slavery for Africans and people of African descent.

New England
The 1677 work The Doings and Sufferings of the Christian Indians documents English colonial prisoners of war (not, in fact, opposing combatants, but imprisoned members of English-allied forces) being enslaved and sent to Caribbean destinations in the aftermath of Metacom's War.  Captive indigenous opponents, including women and children, were also sold into slavery at a substantial profit, to be transported to West Indies colonies.

African and Native American slaves made up a smaller part of the New England economy, which was based on yeoman farming and trades, than in the South, and a smaller fraction of the population, but they were present.  Most were house servants, but some worked at farm labor. The Puritans codified slavery in 1641. The Massachusetts Bay royal colony passed the Body of Liberties, which prohibited slavery in some instances, but did allow three legal bases of slavery. Slaves could be held if they were captives of war, if they sold themselves into slavery, were purchased from elsewhere, or if they were sentenced to slavery by the governing authority. The Body of Liberties used the word "strangers" to refer to people bought and sold as slaves, as they were generally not native born English subjects. Colonists came to equate this term with Native Americans and Africans.

The New Hampshire Assembly in 1714 passed "An Act To Prevent Disorders In The Night", prefiguring the development of sundown towns in the United States:  Notices emphasizing and re-affirming the curfew were published in The New Hampshire Gazette in 1764 and 1771.

New York and New Jersey

The Dutch West India Company introduced slavery in 1625 with the importation of eleven enslaved blacks who worked as farmers, fur traders, and builders to New Amsterdam (present day New York City), capital of the nascent province of New Netherland. The Dutch colony expanded across the North River (Hudson River) to Bergen (in today's New Jersey). Later, slaves were also held privately by settlers in the area. Although enslaved, the Africans had a few basic rights and families were usually kept intact. They were admitted to the Dutch Reformed Church and married by its ministers, and their children could be baptized. Slaves could testify in court, sign legal documents, and bring civil actions against whites. Some were permitted to work after hours earning wages equal to those paid to white workers. When the colony fell to the English in the 1660s, the company freed all its slaves, which created an early nucleus of free Negros in the area.

The English continued to import more slaves. Enslaved Africans performed a wide variety of skilled and unskilled jobs, mostly in the burgeoning port city and surrounding agricultural areas. In 1703 more than 42% of New York City's households held slaves, a percentage higher than in the cities of Boston and Philadelphia, and second only to Charleston in the South.

Midwest, Mississippi River, and Louisiana

The French introduced legalized slavery into their colonies in New France both near the Great Lakes and the Mississippi River. They also used slave labor on their island colonies in the Caribbean: Guadeloupe and especially Saint-Domingue. After the port of New Orleans was founded in 1718 with access to the Gulf Coast, French colonists imported more African slaves to the Illinois Country for use as agricultural or mining laborers. By the mid-eighteenth century, slaves accounted for as much as one-third of the limited population in that rural area.

Slavery was much more extensive in lower colonial Louisiana, where the French developed sugar cane plantations along the Mississippi River. Slavery was maintained during the French (1699–1763, and 1800–1803) and Spanish (1763–1800) periods of government. The first people enslaved by the French were Native Americans, but they could easily escape into the countryside which they knew well. Beginning in the early 18th century, the French imported Africans as laborers in their efforts to develop the colony. Mortality rates were high for both colonists and Africans, and new workers had to be regularly imported.

Implemented in colonial Louisiana in 1724, Louis XIV of France's Code Noir regulated the slave trade and the institution of slavery in the French colonies. As a result, Louisiana and the Mobile, Alabama areas developed very different patterns of slavery compared to the British colonies.

As written, the Code Noir gave some rights to slaves, including the right to marry. Although it authorized and codified cruel corporal punishment against slaves under certain conditions, it forbade slave owners to torture slaves, to separate married couples, and to separate young children from their mothers. It required owners to instruct slaves in the Catholic faith, implying that Africans were human beings endowed with a soul, an idea that had not been acknowledged until then.

The Code Noir forbade interracial marriages, but interracial relationships were formed in La Louisiane from the earliest years. In New Orleans society particularly, a formal system of concubinage, known as plaçage, developed. Usually formed between young white men and African or African-American women, these relationships were formalized with contracts that sometimes provided for freedom for a woman and her children (if she was still enslaved), education for the mixed-race children of the union, especially boys; and sometimes a property settlement. Free people of color became an intermediate social caste between whites and enslaved blacks; many practiced artisan trades, and some acquired educations and property. Some white fathers sent their mixed-race sons to France for education in military schools.

Gradually in the English colonies, slavery became known as a racial caste system that generally encompassed all people of African descent, including those of mixed race. From 1662, Virginia defined social status by the status of the mother, unlike in England, where under common law fathers determined the status of their children, whether legitimate or natural. Thus, under the doctrine of partus sequitur ventrum, children born to enslaved mothers were considered slaves, regardless of their paternity. Similarly, children born to mothers who were free were also free, whether or not of mixed-race. At one time, Virginia had prohibited enslavement of Christian individuals, but lifted that restriction with its 1662 law. In the 19th century, laws were passed to restrict the rights of free people of color and mixed-race people (sometimes referred to as mulattoes) after early slave revolts. During the centuries of slavery in the British colonies, the number of mixed-race slaves increased.

Slave rebellions

Colonial slave rebellions before 1776, or before 1801 for Louisiana, include:
 San Miguel de Gualdape (1526)
 Gloucester County, Virginia Revolt (1663)
 New York Slave Revolt of 1712
 Samba Rebellion (1731)
 Stono Rebellion (1739)
 New York Slave Insurrection of 1741
 1791 Mina conspiracy
 Pointe Coupée conspiracy (1794)

16th century

While the British knew about Spanish and Portuguese slave trading, they did not implement slave labor in the Americas until the 17th century. British travelers were fascinated by the dark-skinned people they found in West Africa; they developed mythologies that situated them in their view of the cosmos.

The first Africans to arrive in England came voluntarily in 1555 with John Lok (an ancestor of the famous philosopher John Locke). Lok intended to teach them English in order to facilitate the trading of material goods with West Africa. This model gave way to a slave trade initiated by John Hawkins, who captured 300 Africans and sold them to the Spanish. Blacks in England were subordinate but never had the legal status of chattel slaves.

In 1607, England established Jamestown as its first permanent colony on the North American continent. Tobacco became the chief commodity crop of the colony, due to the efforts of John Rolfe in 1611. Once it became clear that tobacco was going to drive the Jamestown economy, more workers were needed for the labor-intensive crop. British plantation owners in North America and the Caribbean also needed a workforce for their cash crop plantations, which was initially filled by indentured servants from Britain before transitioning to Native American and West African slave labor. During this period, the English established colonies in Barbados in 1624 and Jamaica in 1655. These and other Caribbean colonies generated wealth by the production of sugar cane, as sugar was in high demand in Europe. They also were an early center of the slave trade for the growing English colonial empire.

English colonists entertained two lines of thought simultaneously toward indigenous Native Americans. Because these people were lighter-skinned, they were seen as more European and therefore as candidates for civilization. At the same time, because they were occupying the land desired by colonists, they were from the beginning, frequent targets of colonial violence.

At first, indentured servants were used for labor. These servants provided up to seven years of service in exchange for having their trip to Jamestown paid for by someone in Jamestown. The person who paid was granted additional land in headrights, dependent on how many persons he paid to travel to the colony. Once the seven years were over, the indentured servant who survived was free to live in Jamestown as a regular citizen. However, colonists began to see indentured servants as too costly, in part because the high mortality rate meant the force had to be resupplied. In addition, an improving economy in England reduced the number of persons who were willing to sign up as indentured servants for the harsh conditions in the colonies.

17th century
In 1619, an English Privateer, The White Lion, with Dutch letters of marque, brought African slaves pillaged from a Portuguese slave ship to Point Comfort.

Several colonial colleges held enslaved people as workers and relied on them to operate.

The development of slavery in 17th-century America

The laws relating to slavery and their enforcement hardened in the second half of the 17th century, and the prospects for Africans and their descendants grew increasingly dim.  By 1640, the Virginia courts had sentenced at least one black servant, John Punch, to slavery. In 1656 Elizabeth Key won a suit for freedom based on her father's status as a free Englishman, his having baptized her as Christian in the Church of England, and the fact that he established a guardianship for her that was supposed to be a limited indenture. Following her case, in 1662 the Virginia House of Burgesses passed a law with the doctrine of partus, stating that any child born in the colony would follow the status of its mother, bond or free. This overturned a long held principle of English Common Law, whereby a child's status followed that of the father. It removed any responsibility for the children from white fathers who had abused and raped slave women. Most did not acknowledge, support, or emancipate their resulting children.

During the second half of the 17th century, the British economy improved and the supply of British indentured servants declined, as poor Britons had better economic opportunities at home. At the same time, Bacon's Rebellion of 1676 led planters to worry about the prospective dangers of creating a large class of restless, landless, and relatively poor white men (most of them former indentured servants). Wealthy Virginia and Maryland planters began to buy slaves in preference to indentured servants during the 1660s and 1670s, and poorer planters followed suit by c.1700. (Slaves cost more than servants, so initially only the wealthy could invest in slaves.) The first British colonists in Carolina introduced African slavery into the colony in 1670, the year the colony was founded, and Charleston ultimately became the busiest slave port in North America. Slavery spread from the South Carolina Lowcountry first to Georgia, then across the Deep South as Virginia's influence had crossed the Appalachians to Kentucky and Tennessee. Northerners also purchased slaves, though on a much smaller scale. Enslaved people outnumbered free whites in South Carolina from the early 1700s to the Civil War. An authoritarian political culture evolved to prevent slave rebellion and justify white slaveholding. Northern slaves typically dwelled in towns, rather than on plantations as in the South, and worked as artisans and artisans' assistants, sailors and longshoremen, and domestic servants.

In 1672, King Charles II rechartered the Royal African Company (it had initially been set up in 1660), as an English monopoly for the African slave and commodities trade—thereafter in 1698, by statute, the English parliament opened the trade to all English subjects. The slave trade to the mid-Atlantic colonies increased substantially in the 1680s, and by 1710 the African population in Virginia had increased to 23,100 (42% of total); Maryland contained 8,000 Africans (23% of total). In the early 18th century, England passed Spain and Portugal to become the world's leading slave-trader.

The North American royal colonies not only imported Africans but also captured Native Americans, impressing them into slavery. Many Native Americans were shipped as slaves to the Caribbean. Many of these slaves from the British colonies were able to escape by heading south, to the Spanish colony of Florida. There they were given their freedom if they declared their allegiance to the King of Spain and accepted the Catholic Church. In 1739 Fort Mose was established by African-American freedmen and became the northern defense post for St. Augustine. In 1740, English forces attacked and destroyed the fort, which was rebuilt in 1752. Because Fort Mose became a haven for escaped slaves from the English colonies to the north, it is considered a precursor site of the Underground Railroad.

Chattel slavery developed in British North America before the full legal apparatus that supported slavery did. During the late 17th century and early 18th century, harsh new slave codes limited the rights of African slaves and cut off their avenues to freedom. The first full-scale slave code in British North America was South Carolina's (1696), which was modeled on the colonial Barbados slave code of 1661. It was updated and expanded regularly throughout the 18th century.

A 1691 Virginia law prohibited slaveholders from emancipating slaves unless they paid for the freedmen's transportation out of Virginia.  Virginia criminalized interracial marriage in 1691, and subsequent laws abolished free blacks' rights to vote, hold office, and bear arms. Virginia's House of Burgesses established the basic legal framework for slavery in 1705.

The Atlantic slave trade to North America

Of the enslaved Africans brought to the New World an estimated 5–7% ended up in British North America. The vast majority of slaves transported across the Atlantic Ocean were sent to the Caribbean sugar colonies, Brazil, or Spanish America. Throughout the Americas, but especially in the Caribbean, tropical disease took a large toll on their population and required large numbers of replacements. Many Africans had limited natural immunity to yellow fever and malaria; but malnutrition, poor housing, inadequate clothing allowances, and overwork contributed to a high mortality rate.

In British North America the slave population rapidly increased via the birth rate, whereas in the Caribbean colonies they did not. The lack of proper nourishment, being suppressed sexually, and poor health are possible reasons. Of the small numbers of babies born to slaves in the Caribbean, only about 1/4 survived the miserable conditions on sugar plantations.

It was not only the major colonial powers of Western Europe such as France, England, Spain, Portugal, and the Netherlands that were involved. Other countries, including Sweden and Denmark, participated in the trans-Atlantic slave trade though on a much more limited scale.

Sexual role differentiation and slavery
"Depending upon their age and gender, slaves were assigned a particular task, or tasks, that had to be completed during the course of the day." In certain settings, men would participate in the hard labor, such as working on the farm, while women would generally work in the household. They would "be sent out on errands but in most cases their jobs required that they spend much of their time within their owner's household." These gender distinctions were mainly applied in the Northern colonies and on larger plantations. In Southern colonies and smaller farms, however, women and men typically engaged in the same roles, both working in the tobacco crop fields for example.

Although slave women and men in some areas performed the same type of day-to-day work, "[t]he female slave ... was faced with the prospect of being forced into sexual relationships for the purpose of reproduction." This reproduction would either be forced between one African slave and another, or between the slave woman and the owner. Slave owners saw slave women in terms of prospective fertility. That way, the number of slaves on a plantation could multiply without having to purchase another African. Unlike the patriarchal society of white Anglo-American colonists, "slave families" were more matriarchal in practice. "Masters believed that slave mothers, like white women, had a natural bond with their children that therefore it was their responsibility—more so than that of slave fathers—to care for their offspring." Therefore, women had the extra responsibility, on top of their other day-to-day work, to take care of children. Men, in turn, were often separated from their families. "At the same time that slaveholders promoted a strong bond between slave mothers and their children, they denied to slave fathers their paternal rights of ownership and authority..." Biological families were often separated by sale.

Indentured servitude

Some historians such as Edmund Morgan and Lerone Bennett have suggested that indentured servitude provided a model for slavery in the 17th-century Crown Colonies. In practice, indentured servants were teenagers in England whose fathers sold their labor voluntarily for a period of time (typically four to seven years), in return for free passage to the colonies, room and board and clothes, and training in an occupation. After that, they received cash, clothing, tools, and/or land, and became ordinary settlers.

The Quaker petition against slavery
In 1688, four German Quakers in Germantown, a town outside Philadelphia, wrote a petition against the use of slaves by English colonists in the nearby countryside. They presented the petition to their local Quaker Meeting, and the Meeting was sympathetic, but could not decide what the appropriate response should be. The Meeting passed the petition up the chain of authority to Philadelphia Yearly Meeting, where it continued to be ignored. It was archived and forgotten for 150 years.

The Quaker petition was the first public American document of its kind to protest slavery. It was also one of the first public declarations of universal human rights. While the petition was forgotten for a time, the idea that every human has equal rights was regularly discussed in Philadelphia Quaker society through the eighteenth century.

18th century
During the Great Awakening of the late eighteenth century, Methodist and Baptist preachers toured in the South, trying to persuade planters to manumit their slaves on the basis of equality in God's eyes. They also accepted slaves as members and preachers of new chapels and churches. The first black churches (all Baptist) in what became the United States were founded by slaves and free blacks in Aiken County, South Carolina, in 1773; Petersburg, Virginia, in 1774; and Savannah, Georgia, in 1778, before the end of the Revolutionary War.

Slavery was officially recognized as a serious offense in 1776 by the Philadelphia Yearly Meeting. The Yearly Meeting had been against slavery since the 1750s.

East Indian slaves
In the early 21st century, new research has revealed that small numbers of East Indians were brought to the colonies as enslaved laborers, during the period when both India and the colonies were under British control. As an example, an ad in the Virginia Gazette of Aug. 4, 1768, describes one young "East Indian" as "a well made fellow, about 5 feet 4 inches high" who had "a thin visage, a very sly look, and a remarkable set of fine white teeth." Another slave is identified as "an East India negro man" who speaks French and English. Most of the Indian slaves were already converted to Christianity, were fluent in English, and took western names. Their original names and homes are not known. Their descendants have mostly merged with the African-American community, which also incorporated European ancestors. Today, descendants of such East Indian slaves may have a small percent of DNA from Asian ancestors but it likely falls below the detectable levels for today's DNA tests, as most of the generations since would have been primarily of ethnic African and European ancestry.

Beginning of the anti-slavery movement

African and African-American slaves expressed their opposition to slavery through armed uprisings such as the Stono Rebellion (1739) in South Carolina. More typically, they resisted through work slowdowns, tool-breaking, and running away, either for short periods or permanently. Until the Revolutionary era, almost no white American colonists spoke out against slavery. Even the Quakers generally tolerated slaveholding (and slave-trading) until the mid-18th century, although they emerged as vocal opponents of slavery in the Revolutionary era. During the Great Awakening, Baptist and Methodist preachers in the South originally urged planters to free their slaves. In the nineteenth century, they more often urged better treatment of slaves.

Further events

Late 18th and 19th century
During and following the Revolution, the northern states all abolished slavery, with New Jersey acting last in 1804. Some of these state jurisdictions enacted the first abolition laws in the entire New World. In states that passed gradual abolition laws, such as New York and New Jersey, children born to slave mothers had to serve an extended period of indenture into young adulthood. In other cases, some slaves were reclassified as indentured servants, effectively preserving the institution of slavery through another name.

Often citing Revolutionary ideals, some slaveholders freed their slaves in the first two decades after independence, either outright or through their wills. The proportion of free blacks rose markedly in the Upper South in this period, before the invention of the cotton gin created a new demand for slaves in the developing "Cotton Kingdom" of the Deep South.

By 1808 (the first year allowed by the Constitution to federally ban the import slave trade), all states (except South Carolina) had banned the international buying or selling of slaves. Acting on the advice of President Thomas Jefferson, who denounced the international trade as "violations of human rights which have been so long continued on the unoffending inhabitants of Africa, in which the morality, the reputation, and the best interests of our country have long been eager to proscribe", in 1807 Congress also banned the international slave trade. However, the domestic slave trade continued in the South. It brought great wealth to the South, especially to New Orleans, which became the fourth largest city in the country, also based on the growth of its port. In the antebellum years, more than one million enslaved African Americans were transported from the Upper South to the developing Deep South, mostly in the slave trade. Cotton culture, dependent on slavery, formed the basis of new wealth in the Deep South.

In 1844 the Quaker petition was rediscovered and became a focus of the burgeoning abolitionist movement.

Emancipation Proclamation and end of slavery in the US
On 1 January 1863, Abraham Lincoln signed Emancipation Proclamation freeing slaves in areas in rebellion during the American Civil War when Union troops advanced south. The Thirteenth Amendment (abolition of slavery and involuntary servitude) was ratified in December 1865.

See also

 Abolitionism in the United States
 American Descendants of Slavery (ADOS)
 Atlantic Creole
 Bristol slave trade
 Thirteenth Amendment to the United States Constitution
 Emancipation Proclamation
 Timeline of abolition of slavery and serfdom
 Colonial history of the United States
 Female slavery in the United States
 Free negro
 Grand Model for the Province of Carolina
 History of labor law in the United States
 History of slavery in Connecticut
 History of slavery in Florida
 History of slavery in Georgia
 History of slavery in Maryland
 History of slavery in Massachusetts
 History of slavery in New Jersey
 History of slavery in New York
 History of slavery in Pennsylvania
 History of slavery in Rhode Island
 History of slavery in Virginia
 Slavery at Tuckahoe plantation
 Indentured servitude in the Americas
 Redemptioner
 Indentured servitude in Pennsylvania
 Indentured servitude in Virginia
 Scramble (slave auction)
 Seasoning (colonialism)
 Slave Trade Act
 Slavery among Native Americans in the United States
 Indian slave trade in the American Southeast
 Slavery at common law
 Slavery in the British and French Caribbean
 Slavery in the Spanish New World colonies
 Slavery in the United States

References
Footnotes

Citations

Sources
 
 Wood, Betty. The Origins of American Slavery. New York: Hill and Wang, 1997. .

Further reading
 Aptheker, Herbert. American Negro Slave Revolts. 50th Anniversary edition. New York: International Publishers, 1993. 
 Berlin, Ira. Many Thousands Gone: The First Two Centuries of Slavery in North America. Cambridge: Belknap Press of Harvard University, 1998.
 Genovese, Eugene D. Roll, Jordan, Roll: The World the Slaves Made. New York: Pantheon, 1974.
 Gutman, Herbert G. The Black Family in Slavery and Freedom, 1750–1925. New York: Pantheon, 1976.
 Huggins, Nathan. Black Odyssey: The African-American Ordeal in Slavery. New York: Pantheon, 1990.
 Jewett, Clayton E.  and John O. Allen; Slavery in the South: A State-By-State History. (Greenwood Press, 2004)
 Levine, Lawrence W. Black Culture and Black Consciousness: Afro-American Folk Thought from Slavery to Freedom. New York: Oxford University Press, 1977.
 McManus, Edgar J.  A History of Negro Slavery in New York, Syracuse University Press, 1966
 Morgan, Edmund S. American Slavery, American Freedom: The Ordeal of Colonial Virginia. New York: Norton, 1975.
 Olwell, Robert. Masters, Slaves, & Subjects: The Culture of Power in the South Carolina Low Country, 1740–1790 (1998).
 Schwalm, Leslie A. A Hard Fight for We: Women's Transition from Slavery to Freedom in South Carolina. Urbana: University of Illinois Press, 1997.
 Silkenat, David. Scars on the Land: An Environmental History of Slavery in the American South. New York: Oxford University Press, 2022.
 Snyder, Terri L. The Power to Die: Slavery and Suicide in British North America. Chicago: University of Chicago Press, 2015.
 
 White, Deborah Gray. Ar'n't I a Woman? Female Slaves in the Plantation South. (Norton, 1985) excerpt.
 Williams, Eric, Capitalism and Slavery. 4th edition, 1975.
 Wood, Betty. Slavery in Colonial America, 1619–1776 (2005) excerpt
 Wood, Peter H. Black Majority: Negroes in Colonial South Carolina from 1670 through the Stono Rebellion (1974).

External links
 Immigrant Servants Database
 Slavery and the slave trade collaboration by UNESCO, Colonial Williamsburg and others

1600 establishments in the Thirteen Colonies
1776 disestablishments in the Thirteen Colonies
Colonial United States
Colonial United States
Slavery
Slavery